Serhiy Krulykovskyi (28 November 1945 – 2 October 2015) was a Soviet-era Ukrainian football player. He was a three-time champion of the USSR as a part of Dynamo Kyiv from 1966 to 1968.

Career
Krulykovskyi started his football career in 1958 as part of a youth league. In 1961, he joined FC Polissya Zhytomyr as part of the Soviet Second League. In 1963, however, he moved on to play for Dynamo Kyiv, but debuted in the 1964 season. His team won the Soviet Cup that year and he was rewarded as the best debutante of that year. He was part of the Soviet Top League from 1966 to 1968. During this time, he played 87 matches and kicked two goals. From 1971 to 1973, however, he played for FC Chornomorets Odesa and afterwards for MFC Mykolaiv.

After he retired from his career, Krulykovskyi coached a children's team in Odessa. He later was a staff member of the Football Federation of Ukraine and also took part in the Ukrainian First League. He died on 2 October 2015.

References

1945 births
2015 deaths
People from Zviahel
Ukrainian footballers
Soviet footballers
FC Polissya Zhytomyr players
FC Dynamo Kyiv players
FC Chornomorets Odesa players
MFC Mykolaiv players
Soviet Top League players
Burials at Zvirynets Cemetery
Association football defenders
Sportspeople from Zhytomyr Oblast